Gustav Hartlaub begins a world bird collection
Death of Constantine Samuel Rafinesque
Death of Charles Fothergill
Death of Nicholas Aylward Vigors
Abel Aubert du Petit-Thouars Voyage autour du monde sur la frégate La Vénus pendant les années 1836-1839 (10 volumes, 1840–1864) The birds in this work were illustrated by Paul Louis Oudart (1796–1860)Capitaine : Abel Aubert du Petit-Thouars (1793–1864), Ingénieur hydrographe : Urbain Dortet de Tessan (1804–1879), Médecin-naturaliste : Adolphe-Simon Neboux (1806–1844), Chirurgien : Charles René Augustin Léclancher (1804–1857)
William Thompson presents a list of the birds of Ireland to the British Association for the Advancement of Science
Johann Jakob Kaup becomes  Inspector of the Grand Ducal museum in Darmstadt
Luigi Benoit Ornitologia siciliana : o sia catalogo ragionato degli uccelli che si trovano in Sicilia Messina: Giuseppe Fiumara, 1840. online BHL
Alexander Keyserling and Johann Heinrich Blasius publish Die Wirbelthiere Europa's (Vertebrates of Europe)
Ongoing events
William Jardine and Prideaux John Selby with the co-operation of James Ebenezer Bicheno Illustrations of ornithology various publishers (Four volumes) 1825 and [1836–43]. Although issued partly in connection with the volume of plates, under the same title (at the time of issue), text and plates were purchasable separately and the publishers ... express the hope, also voiced by the author in his preface to the present work, that the text will constitute an independent work of reference. Vol. I was issued originally in 1825 [by A. Constable, Edinburgh], with nomenclature according to Temminck
Birding and ornithology by year
1840 in science